The United Arab Emirates (UAE) once largely known for its oil exports today has a diverse and highly developed economy. According to the UAE Economic Report 2009 released by the UAE Ministry of Economy in May 2010 the non-oil sector contributed 71.6 per cent to the UAE’s GDP, compared to 66.5 per cent in 2008, underscoring the success of the nation's economic diversification initiatives.

The UAE is investing heavily in adopting and implementing Information and Communication Technology (ICT) in its government and private sectors. The Global Information Technology Report 2010-2011 indicates that the UAE leads the MENA region in leveraging ICT for increased economic diversification and competitiveness. The contribution of telecommunications sector in the UAE’s economy rose from 4.1 per cent in 2007 to 5.3 per cent in 2010 according to ‘UAE Telecommunications Sector Developments & Indicators (2007-2010)’, issued in May 2011 by Telecommunications Regulatory Authority (TRA), UAE. Abu Dhabi Department of Economic Development estimates that investments in IT and Telecom sectors are likely to reach AED18.4 billion (USD5 billion) in 2011, as against AED16.1 billion in 2010.

The eGovernment program in the UAE is a key initiative of the UAE Government Strategy 2011-2013 that lays the foundation to achieve UAE Vision 2021.

Inception and timeline
The UAE started some of its eServices such as eDirham in as early as the year 2001. The service initiated by the Ministry of Finance replaced the traditional way of paying and collecting fees for government services. The government gradually made more services available online.

The official portal of the UAE Government
The official portal of the UAE Government is  https://u.ae/ (old URL: www.government.ae). It is part of the federal eGovernment program and a major milestone in the process of eTransformation in the UAE.

This portal brings all eServices provided by the UAE federal and local government bodies under one umbrella. It also provides information regarding accessing the government services through mobile phones and other similar electronic devices, and other means such as ATMs and public payment machines.

The aim of the portal is to provide more and better online services to the people of the UAE and involve them in the government's policies, laws, and public interest initiatives with the ultimate goal of achieving transparency.

Functions
The function of the official portal is to act as a single window or a single entry-point for users to access the different federal and local government eServices. The portal also facilitates to boost communication between the customers and the government representatives and eParticipation through forums, blogs, surveys, polls and social media. Government.ae is the parent portal for the sub-portals on eParticipation, eServices, mServices and UAE Open Data.

eServices
The UAE Government provides a range of services through its official portal www.government.ae. The eServices are classified into services for individuals, businesses and visitors. Through the eServices, it is now very easy for the people of the UAE to avail a variety of services without leaving their home or office spaces. The portal has an advanced search facility to help people look for the services they want to access. The portal also contains a section on alternate means for accessing government services.

mServices
The portal also provides adequate information on the various services that are available through mobile devices and how to avail them with the help of specially developed short codes and mobile applications. The portal has links to download smart phone applications for Blackberry, iPhone and Android.

Innovative and facilitating option for the business was launched in 2013 when a smart phone app for business registration and licensing was unveiled in Dubai.

eParticipation
One of the major features of the enhanced portal is the inclusion of eParticipation channels. The federal portal has engaged multiple platforms like forums, blogs, chats, surveys, polls and social media tools like Facebook, Twitter, Flickr and YouTube to reach out to the general public and engage them in active communication with the government with regard to their opinions and experiences on government services, policies etc.

Open Data
Under Open Data, government data and information is made available to the public. People can now have access to economic data, population statistics, etc. Open Data could benefit students, economists and researchers in particular and the public in general.

ICT infrastructure and penetration
According to Telecommunications Regulatory Authority’s (TRA) May 2011 figures, the UAE has 196.3 mobile phone subscriptions per 100 inhabitants and with 1,417,519 internet subscribers, the UAE has 62.4 internet users per 100 inhabitants.

eReadiness ranking
eReadiness or Networked Readiness Index (NRI) measures the level of preparedness of a country's government to deliver services and information online and the overall value it delivers to the public. eReadiness or the Readiness Index involves the government’s ability to use Information and Communication Technology (ICT) to boost their socio-economic conditions and overall public welfare.

Global Information Technology Report (GITR)
According to The GITR 2010-2011, UAE was ranked first amongst Arab countries and stood 24th amongst 138 countries reviewed in the Networked Readiness Index (NRI), indicating the importance the country gives to Information and Communication Technology as a crucial instrument for economic diversification, enhanced efficiency and modernization. The same report showed Qatar’s position at 25, Bahrain’s position at 30, Saudi Arabia at 33 and Oman at 41.

The UAE is one of the few countries in the region that has maintained its steady climb in the eReadiness ranking chart. The UAE shot up six positions in NRI; from 29th position amongst 127 countries reviewed in 2007–2008 to 23rd amongst 133 countries reviewed in 2009–2010.

UN eGovernment Survey
United Nations Public Administration Network (UNPAN) also conducts a similar survey and publishes its report on eGovernment ranking. The report called UN eGovernment Survey was published annually until 2005 but later became a biennial publication.

The UAE’s overall ranking as per the UN eGovernment Survey has gone through many ups and downs. UAE’s rank rose for two consecutive surveys; it leapt from 60th rank in 2004 by 18 ranks to be at 42nd position in the year 2005 and then rose by 10 ranks to be at 32nd position in the year 2008. However, its rank took a steep dip in 2010 attaining 49th position. However, overall, UAE was ranked fourth in the region in 2010 report.

Emirates eGovernment
Emirates eGovernment is responsible for developing, implementing and maintaining the eGovernment program at the federal level in the UAE. This involves renovating and upgrading the conventional methods of delivering the government services and having the services delivered electronically through the deployment of modern Information and communication technologies (ICT).

Services
Emirates eGovernment has set up the UAE’s official portal www.government.ae, which is a major milestone in the process of eTransformation in the UAE. This portal brings all eServices and information provided by the UAE federal and local government bodies under one umbrella.

Emirates eGovernment provides services on G2G, G2B and G2C levels. The UAE’s official portal www.government.ae falls under the G2B and G2C level. Under G2G services, the entity provides cloud and Government Website Evaluation Index (GWEI) services.

Initiatives and awards
Emirates eGovernment pioneers various initiatives that aid the development of the eGovernment program in the UAE. It is actively involved in projects that promote the usage of eServices and Information and Communication Technology (ICT) tools by the federal government entities and the public in a safe and effective way to achieve better delivery of services and good governance.

Emirates eGovernment regularly holds workshops for internal staff and federal government employees on topics relating to eGovernment, cloud services such as Morasalate and Malafate, IT trends, effective use of ICT to achieve the entity’s goals etc.

Policies and Guidelines
Emirates eGovernment drafted a number of guidelines for federal government entities in the UAE. These guidelines deal with websites, social media usage, web content. Emirates eGovernment also issued draft documents related to eParticipation and open data. These guidelines comprise recommendations on the content style, design, layout, accessibility features etc. to make the federal government websites in accordance with the international standards of web content and design as laid down by World Wide Web Consortium.

The Guidelines for Social Media Usage won Emirates eGovernment the 2011 ‘Social Media Initiative of the Year’ award. The guidelines document was prepared in partnership with and extensive support from Dubai School of Government's Governance and Innovation Program and in collaboration with the UAE Government entities. Senior Advisors at Information Technology research firm Gartner Inc. and United Nations eGovernment Programme also offered their assistance and recommendations in preparing this document.

Local eGovernment Programs
eGovernment in the UAE has been launched and is successfully operating at local levels as well. The governments of six out of the seven emirates, Abu Dhabi, Dubai, Sharjah, Ras Al Khaimah, Ajman and Fujairah have launched their official portals.

The portals offer many interactive and transactional services such as bill payments, license renewals etc. In addition, Abu Dhabi and Dubai government portals offer information and advice to residents, businesses and visitors on related matters such as how to apply for health card, how to obtain drivers’ license, or how to apply for visa.

The UAE Government is aiming for the electronic transformation or eTransformation of many of its services at the federal level. The UAE government is taking many steps to achieve this. Sheikh Mohammed bin Rashid Al Maktoum, Vice President and Prime Minister of the UAE and Ruler of Dubai stressed, while launching the federal portal of the UAE that "eTransformation in the UAE and the provision of federal and local services through one portal contributes to enhance the state’s competitiveness and opens up broader prospects for direct communication with community groups and works to enhance the effectiveness and efficiency of governmental work in the country."

References 

United Arab Emirates
Government of the United Arab Emirates
Science and technology in the United Arab Emirates